The men's 1000 metres race of the 2013–14 ISU Speed Skating World Cup 4, arranged in Sportforum Hohenschönhausen, in Berlin, Germany, was held on 7 December 2013.

Mo Tae-bum of South Korea won the race, followed by Michel Mulder of the Netherlands in second place, and Shani Davis of the United States in third place. Thomas Krol of the Netherlands won the Division B race.

Results
The race took place on Saturday, 7 December, with Division B scheduled in the morning session, at 09:54, and Division A scheduled in the afternoon session, at 13:41.

Division A

Division B

References

Men 1000
4